Dilaver Zrnanović (born 17 November 1984) is a Bosnian retired football defender.

Club career
Zrnanović signed with FC Moscow but only appeared in one 1/16th round Russian Cup match for the club. After a brief loan spell, he signed with MTZ-RIPO Minsk in 2008. He scored his first Belarusian Premier League goal for MTZ-RIPO in a 4–2 victory against FC Gomel on 19 September 2009.

In August 2011 Zrnanović agreed a one-year contract with FK Sarajevo. A year later, after his Sarajevo contract had expired, Zrnanović joined Azerbaijan Premier League side Simurq. Zrnanović made his debut for Simurq on 4 August 2012 in a 1-1 draw against Gabala. Zrnanović left Simurq at the end of the 2013–14 season after losing his place in the team to Idan Weitzman.

Career statistics

Honours
 Russian Cup finalist: 2007 (played 1 game for the main squad of FC Moscow).

References 

1984 births
Living people
Footballers from Sarajevo
Association football defenders
Bosnia and Herzegovina footballers
FK Budućnost Banovići players
FC Moscow players
FC Daugava players
FC Partizan Minsk players
FK Sarajevo players
Simurq PIK players
FK Sloboda Tuzla players
Latvian Higher League players
Belarusian Premier League players
Premier League of Bosnia and Herzegovina players
Azerbaijan Premier League players
Bosnia and Herzegovina expatriate footballers
Expatriate footballers in Russia
Bosnia and Herzegovina expatriate sportspeople in Russia
Expatriate footballers in Latvia
Bosnia and Herzegovina expatriate sportspeople in Latvia
Expatriate footballers in Belarus
Bosnia and Herzegovina expatriate sportspeople in Belarus
Expatriate footballers in Azerbaijan
Bosnia and Herzegovina expatriate sportspeople in Azerbaijan